Somebody Loves You is the second studio album by American country music artist Crystal Gayle. It was released on October 20, 1975. It peaked at #11 on the Billboard Country Albums chart, with two tracks that broke into the Top Ten Country Singles: the title song, "Somebody Loves You", peaked at #8, and Gayle scored her first ever #1 country hit with "I'll Get Over You".

Critical reception
Reviewing a reissue of the album, Record Collector wrote that "the elegant two-step of 'I’ll Get Over You' and the bouncy title track [give] Gayle more substantial and challenging melodies to tackle."

Track listing

Personnel
Crystal Gayle - vocals
Jimmy Colvard - electric and acoustic guitar
Allen Reynolds - acoustic guitar, backing vocals
Lloyd Green - steel guitar
Buddy Spicher - fiddle
Joe Allen - bass
Shane Keister - keyboards
Charles Cochran - keyboards, string arrangements
Kenny Malone - drums, percussion
Garth Fundis, Janie Fricke - backing vocals

Charts

Weekly charts

Year-end charts

References

Crystal Gayle albums
Albums produced by Allen Reynolds
United Artists Records albums
1975 albums